Calvin Callahan (born March 2, 1999) is an American Republican politician.  He serves as a member of the Wisconsin State Assembly, representing the 35th Assembly district. His district comprises Lincoln County, western Langlade County, and neighboring towns in Marathon, Oneida, and Shawano counties, in north-central Wisconsin. He also serves as a member of the Lincoln County Board of Supervisors, first elected in 2018, and a supervisor of the town of Wilson.

Early life and education 
A native of Tomahawk, Wisconsin, Callahan graduated from Tomahawk High School in 2017. In 2018, he enrolled at the University of Wisconsin–Stevens Point, where he is studying business administration and management. He is slated to earn a Bachelor of Business Administration in 2022.

Career 
In 2017 and 2018, Callahan worked as an intern in the office of Congressman Sean Duffy. After graduating from high school, Callahan worked as a field organizer and regional field director for the Republican Party of Wisconsin. Callahan was elected to the Lincoln County Board of Supervisors in April 2018, defeating incumbent Kirby Crosby. He was reelected in 2020 without opposition. He was also the founder of Callahan Wholesale.

On the County Board, Callahan serves on the Administrative and Legislative committee, which oversees county operations, and the Land Services committee, which manages zoning issues. Callahan has been active with the county's Economic Development division, and serves as Lincoln County's sole representative on the regional Central Wisconsin Economic Development Board.

After incumbent representative Mary Felzkowski opted not to seek re-election to the Wisconsin State Assembly and instead run for the Wisconsin State Senate, Callahan announced his candidacy to succeed her. He defeated Don Nelson in the Republican primary and Democratic nominee Tyler Ruprecht in the November general election. At age 21 when elected, he was one of the youngest members of the Assembly.

Personal life
Callahan resides in rural Wilson, Lincoln County, Wisconsin, near the unincorporated community of McCord, Wisconsin, on the border with Oneida County. He is a member of the National Rifle Association, the Somo Fish and Game Club, the Wisconsin Bear Hunters Association, Wisconsin Trappers Association, Somo ATV Club, and the Wisconsin ATV/UTV Association.

Electoral history

Lincoln County Board (2018, 2020)

| colspan="6" style="text-align:center;background-color: #e9e9e9;"| General Election, April 3, 2018

| colspan="6" style="text-align:center;background-color: #e9e9e9;"| General Election, April 7, 2020

Wisconsin Assembly (2020)

| colspan="6" style="text-align:center;background-color: #e9e9e9;"| Republican Primary, August 11, 2020

| colspan="6" style="text-align:center;background-color: #e9e9e9;"| General Election, November 3, 2020

References

External links
 
 
 Campaign website
 Official page at Lincoln County, Wisconsin
 35th Assembly District map (2011–2021)

Living people
County supervisors in Wisconsin
Republican Party members of the Wisconsin State Assembly
People from Tomahawk, Wisconsin
University of Wisconsin–Stevens Point alumni
21st-century American politicians
Year of birth uncertain
1999 births